Mueena Mohamed (born 22 May 1982) is a Maldivian retired table tennis player. She is currently a fitness coach for the national women’s football team and the youth teams.

Career records
Singles (as of July 28, 2019)
Indian Ocean Island Games: runner-up (2011); third (2015)
Association Championship: winner (16 times)

Women's doubles
Indian Ocean Island Games: runner-up (2019)
Association Championship: winner (12 times)

Mixed doubles
Association Championship: winner (7 times)

Team
Indian Ocean Island Games: winner (2019); third (2015)

References

External links 
Career profile of Mueena Mohamed - International Table Tennis Federation

1982 births
Living people
Table tennis players at the 2010 Asian Games
Table tennis players at the 2014 Asian Games
Asian Games competitors for the Maldives
Table tennis players at the 2010 Commonwealth Games